Sharon Prete Main Street Plaza (also known as Main Street Plaza, Prete Main Street Plaza, and Prete Plaza) is a public square with a fountain in Round Rock, Texas, United States.

The plaza hosts the city-sponsored Music on Main concert series. Dale Watson was featured in 2021, following a break in the series because of the COVID-19 pandemic. The site has also hosted the Frontier Days festival and Movies in the Park.

References

External links

 
 Downtown Plazas at the City of Round Rock
 Events, Prete Main Street Plaza at the City of Round Rock
 Round Rock’s Main Street Plaza Fountain at Austin.com

Round Rock, Texas
Squares in the United States